The Shimmering Hour is an album from New York City IDM artist Wisp.

Track listing
Side A

"Teddy Oggie" - 3:20
"Picatrix" - 5:31
"Keeper Of The Hills" - 6:00
"Flat Rock" - 3:47
"Seaway Trail" - 5:38
"Hexenringe" - 6:29
"Cultus Klatawa" - 6:32

Side B

"Katabatic" - 3:25
"Summoner's Hollow" - 7:02
"World Rim Walker" - 4:58
"The Shaper" - 3:22
"Hidebehind" - 5:02
"The Fire Above" - 6:34
"Winter of Flight" - 4:51

References

External links
 Official site 
 Album on Rephlex Records

2009 albums
Wisp (musician) albums